Saint-Séglin (Gallo: Saent-Segelein) is a commune in the Ille-et-Vilaine department in Brittany in northwestern France.

Population
Inhabitants of Saint-Séglin are called Séglinois in French.

See also
Communes of the Ille-et-Vilaine department
Maria Justeau

References

External links

Mayors of Ille-et-Vilaine Association 

Communes of Ille-et-Vilaine